United Tribes Technical College (UTCC) is a private tribal land-grant community college in Bismarck, North Dakota.  In 2012, UTTC had an enrollment 885 students, 635 full-time undergraduates, and 250 part-time undergraduates.

History
The UTTC was founded in 1969 by an association of North Dakota's native tribes. The United Tribes of North Dakota Development Corporation
chartered UTTC in Bismarck, North Dakota in 1969. The UTTC applied for, and was granted candidacy for accreditation status by the North Central Association in 1978. The UTTC received full membership in NCA as a vocational technical school in spring 1982. In 1987, the UTTC received authority from NCA to offer its first associate degree program. In 1994, the college was designated a land-grant college alongside 31 other tribal colleges.

In 2003, the UTTC became the first Tribal College to receive accreditation for online programs offering associate of applied sciences degree programs.

Governance
The UTTC is owned and operated by and serves the five Tribal Nations located entirely or in-part of North Dakota:
 Sisseton-Wahpeton Oyate, 
 Spirit Lake Nation, 
Standing Rock Sioux Tribe, 
Three Affiliated Tribes (Mandan, Hidatsa, and Arikara Nation) of the Fort Berthold Reservation, and 
Turtle Mountain Band of Chippewa.

Academics
The UTTC offers certificate programs,  two-year degrees and four-year degrees in over 20 programs of study.

Partnerships
UTTC is a member of the American Indian Higher Education Consortium (AIHEC), which is a community of tribally and federally chartered institutions working to strengthen tribal nations and make a lasting difference in the lives of American Indians and Alaska Natives. UTTC was created in response to the higher education needs of American Indians. UTTC generally serves geographically isolated populations that have no other means accessing education beyond the high school level.

References

External links
Official website

Private universities and colleges in North Dakota
American Indian Higher Education Consortium
Educational institutions established in 1969
Buildings and structures in Bismarck, North Dakota
Education in Burleigh County, North Dakota
1969 establishments in North Dakota
NJCAA athletics